Two ships of the Royal Norwegian Navy have borne the name HNoMS Ørnen, after the Norwegian word for The Eagle:

  was a corvette launched in 1829 and scrapped in 1874.
  was a corvette launched in 1849 and sold in 1866.

Royal Norwegian Navy ship names